Sullangudi is a village in the Ariyalur taluk of Ariyalur district, Tamil Nadu, India.

Demographics 

 census, Sullangudi had a total population of 2,754 with 1,317 males and 1,437 females.

References 

Villages in Ariyalur district